The Americas Zone was one of three zones of regional competition in the 1996 Fed Cup.

Group I
 Venue: Club Palestino, Santiago, Chile (outdoor clay)
 Date: 22–28 April

The eight teams were divided into two pools of four teams. The top two teams of each pool play-off in a two-round knockout stage to decide which nation progresses to World Group II play-offs. Nations finishing in the bottom place in each pool were relegated to Americas Zone Group II for 1997.

Pools

Knockout stage

  advanced to World Group II Play-offs.
  and  relegated to Group II in 1997.

Group II
 Venue: Santo Domingo, Dominican Republic (outdoor clay)
 Date: 6–12 May

The thirteen teams were divided into two pools of six and seven. The top team from each pool then moved would advance to Group I for 1997.

Pools

  and  advanced to Group I in 1997.

See also
Fed Cup structure

References

 Fed Cup Profile, Chile
 Fed Cup Profile, Colombia
 Fed Cup Profile, Mexico
 Fed Cup Profile, Venezuela
 Fed Cup Profile, Brazil
 Fed Cup Profile, Puerto Rico
 Fed Cup Profile, Ecuador
 Fed Cup Profile, Bolivia
 Fed Cup Profile, El Salvador
 Fed Cup Profile, Guatemala
 Fed Cup Profile, Bahamas
 Fed Cup Profile, Peru
 Fed Cup Profile, Cuba
 Fed Cup Profile, Dominican Republic
 Fed Cup Profile, Costa Rica
 Fed Cup Profile, Trinidad and Tobago
 Fed Cup Profile, Jamaica

External links
 Fed Cup website

 
Americas
Sport in Santiago
Tennis tournaments in Chile
Sport in Santo Domingo
Tennis tournaments in the Dominican Republic
1996 in Chilean tennis